1967 in philosophy

Events

Publications 
 Max Horkheimer, Critique of Instrumental Reason (1967)
 Marshall McLuhan, The Medium Is the Massage (1967)
 Roland Barthes, Death of the Author (1967)
 Donald Davidson, Truth and Meaning (1967)
 Martin Luther King Jr., Where Do We Go from Here: Chaos or Community? (1967)
 Jacques Derrida, Of Grammatology (1967), Writing and Difference (1967), and Speech and Phenomena (1967)
 Guy Debord, The Society of the Spectacle (1967)
 Jürgen Habermas, On the Logic of the Social Sciences (1967)

Philosophical literature 
 Brian Aldiss, Report on Probability A (1967)

Births

Deaths

References 

Philosophy
20th-century philosophy
Philosophy by year